McGeorge is both a surname and a given name. McGeorge are a branch of the MacFheorais family which moved from Ireland to Galloway, and which in itself was part of the De Birmingham family.
Notable people with this name include:

Surname:
Alexander Crow McGeorge (1868–1953), New Zealand engineer and businessman
Don W. McGeorge (born 1954), American businessman
Jack McGeorge (1949–2009), American Marine and Secret Service agent
Jerry McGeorge (born 1945), American musician
Lee McGeorge Durrell (born 1949), American naturalist
Missie McGeorge (born 1959), American golfer
Rich McGeorge (born 1948), American footballer

Given name:
McGeorge Bundy (1919–1996), American National Security Advisor

See also
MacGeorge or Macgeorge a similar surname
McGeorge School of Law, law school in Sacramento, California